Michael Reys (born 17 February 1966 in Ratingen, West Germany) is a Dutch slalom canoer who competed from the late 1980s to the mid-1990s. He finished 11th in the K-1 event at both the 1992 and the 1996 Summer Olympics.

References
Sports-Reference.com profile

1966 births
Living people
Canoeists at the 1992 Summer Olympics
Canoeists at the 1996 Summer Olympics
Dutch male canoeists
Olympic canoeists of the Netherlands
People from Ratingen
Sportspeople from Düsseldorf (region)
20th-century Dutch people